Marsh gentian is a common name for several plants and may refer to:

Gentiana affinis, native to western North America
Gentiana pneumonanthe, native to Europe